Josef Kastein (6 October 1890 – 13 June 1946), was a German-born writer and jurist.

Biography
Julius Katzenstein (later Josef Kastein) was born in Germany. In 1926 he moved to Ascona, Switzerland. In 1935, he immigrated to Mandatory Palestine and settled in Tel Aviv.

In 1931, his book Eine Geschichte der Juden was published by Rowohlt Verlag in Berlin (and later translated into English, Hebrew and Dutch).

According to Douglas Reed, Kastein was a "zealous Zionist historian... who holds that the Old Testament was in fact a political programme, drafted to meet the conditions of a time, and frequently revised to meet changing conditions.... and that the Law laid down in the Old Testament must be fulfilled to the letter."

Published works 
 Melchior. Ein hanseatischer Kaufmannsroman. Bremen, Friesen-Verlag, c1927.
 The Messiah of Ismir: Sabbatai Zevi. Translated by Huntley Paterson. New York, Viking Press, c1931.
 Eine Geschichte der Juden. Berlin, Ernst Rowohlt Verlag, 1931. (Reed. Vienna, Löwit, 1935).
 Jews in Germany. Translated from the German by Dorothy Richardson, with a preface by James Stephens. London, The Cresset press, 1934.
 Uriel da Costa, oder, Die Tragoedie der Gesinnung. Berlin, Rowohlt, 1932.
 Juedische Neuorientierung. Vienna, R. Loewit, 1935.
 History and destiny of the Jews. Translated by Huntley Paterson. Garden City, N.Y., Garden City publishing co., inc., 1936.

References

External links 
 
 Personality of the Week – Katzenstein at www.bh.org.il
 Maremagnum at www.maremagnum.com
 Guide to the Papers of Josef Kastein (1890-1946) and Shulamith Kastein (1894-1983) at the Leo Baeck Institute, New York.

Jurists from Bremen (state)
German non-fiction writers
Writers from Bremen
1890 births
1946 deaths
German male non-fiction writers
Jewish emigrants from Nazi Germany to Mandatory Palestine
20th-century non-fiction writers